Reginald James Bennett (5 September 1906 – 2 July 1989) was an Australian rules footballer who played with South Melbourne in the Victorian Football League (VFL).

Bennett later served in the Australian Army during World War II.

Notes

External links 

1906 births
1989 deaths
Australian rules footballers from Victoria (Australia)
Sydney Swans players
Collegians Football Club players